The 2017–18 Northern Kentucky Norse men's basketball team represented Northern Kentucky University (NKU) during the 2017–18 NCAA Division I men's basketball season. The Norse, led by third-year head coach John Brannen, played their home games at BB&T Arena in Highland Heights, Kentucky as members of the Horizon League. They finished the season 22–10, 15–3 in Horizon League play to win the Horizon League regular season championship. They were upset in the quarterfinals of the Horizon League tournament by No. 8 seed Cleveland State. As a regular season league champion who failed to win their league tournament, they received an automatic bid to the National Invitation Tournament where they lost in the first round to Louisville.

The Norse shared their home arena, BB&T Arena, with the University of Cincinnati's men's basketball team during the season while Cincinnati's home arena, Fifth Third Arena, underwent renovations during the season.

Previous season
The Norse finished the 2016–17 season 24–11, 13–6 in Horizon League play to finish in a tie for third place. As the No. 4 seed in the Horizon League tournament, they defeated Wright State, Youngstown State, and Milwaukee to win the Horizon League tournament. They received the conference's automatic bid to the NCAA tournament in the school's first year of eligibility after its transition to a Division I school. They lost in the first round to Kentucky.

Offseason

Departures

Incoming transfers

Recruiting class of 2017

Roster

Schedule and results

|-
!colspan=9 style=| Exhibition

|-bs
!colspan=9 style=| Non-conference regular season

|-
!colspan=9 style=| Horizon League regular season

|-
!colspan=9 style=|Horizon League tournament

|-
!colspan=9 style=|NIT

References

Northern Kentucky Norse men's basketball seasons
Northern Kentucky
Northern Kentucky
Northern Kentucky
Northern Kentucky